Clifford B. Huskilson (born February 11, 1953) is a Canadian politician. He represented the electoral district of Shelburne in the Nova Scotia House of Assembly from 1993 to 1999. He was a member of the Nova Scotia Liberal Party.

Early life and education
Born in Yarmouth, Nova Scotia in 1953, Huskilson graduated with a Bachelor of Science degree from Dalhousie University and a diploma from the Nova Scotia Funeral Directors Association.

Political career
Huskilson was elected MLA for Shelburne in the 1993 provincial election, succeeding his father Harold Huskilson, who had represented the riding since 1970. Following his re-election in 1998, Huskilson was appointed to the Executive Council of Nova Scotia as Minister of Transportation and Public Works. In the 1999 election, Huskilson led Progressive Conservative candidate Cecil O'Donnell by one vote on election night, however a judicial recount on August 17 resulted in a tie which was broken when the ridings returning officer picked O'Donnell's name from a box. Huskilson attempted to regain the seat in the 2003 election, but lost to O'Donnell by close to 600 votes.

References

Living people
Nova Scotia Liberal Party MLAs
Members of the Executive Council of Nova Scotia
Dalhousie University alumni
People from Shelburne County, Nova Scotia
1953 births